The PGM-1-class motor gunboats were a class of eight gunboats converted for the United States Navy from 1943-1944 and were succeeded by the s.  All eight PGM-1s were converted from s.  The PGM-1s were created to support PT boats in the Pacific, but were too slow to keep up.  The PGM-1s were discontinued and the PGM-9s, also too slow, were shifted to support minesweeping ships instead.

PGM-7 was the only PGM-1-class vessel lost in World War II.  The others were sent to the Foreign Liquidation Commission in 1947.  Their exact fate is unknown.

Sources
INFORMATION ON WWII SCs

Gunboats of the United States Navy
 
Gunboat classes